Ivan Mai (born 8 November 1995) is a Ukrainian para table tennis player. He won one of the bronze medals in the men's individual C9 event at the 2020 Summer Paralympics held in Tokyo, Japan. He also won one of the bronze medals in the men's team C9–10 event.

References

Living people
1995 births
Ukrainian male table tennis players
Paralympic table tennis players of Ukraine
Paralympic bronze medalists for Ukraine
Paralympic medalists in table tennis
Table tennis players at the 2020 Summer Paralympics
Medalists at the 2020 Summer Paralympics
Sportspeople from Poltava
21st-century Ukrainian people